Eunice Brookman-Amssiah is a Ghanaian former Minister of Health and also served as an Ambassador to the Kingdom of the Netherlands under the Rawlings government. She was the first female vice-president of the Ghana Medical Association.

References

Living people
Women government ministers of Ghana
Year of birth missing (living people)
20th-century Ghanaian politicians
20th-century Ghanaian women politicians
20th-century diplomats
Ghanaian women ambassadors
Ambassadors of Ghana to the Netherlands